Charles Robertson (1875–1958) was the Norwegian Minister of Trade 1926–1928 and part of Lykke's Cabinet.

He was the son of merchant Nicolai George Robertson and his wife Anna Albrethson. His father's family came from Scotland to Hammerfest with his grandfather Charles Robertson the Elder in 1827. The family business G. Robertson traded in salted fish, stockfish, shark fishing and seal hunting. They had a number of branches and fishing villages along the Finnmark coast.

On 24 May 1899 he married his cousin Gudrun Brandt-Rantzau, daughter of district physician Johannes Brandt-Rantzau and Nicoline Cecilie Mathea Robertson. His sister Anna Robertson married Attorney General and later Minister of State Andreas Urbye. His niece Gudrun Martius, married the diplomat Johan Georg Alexius Ræder.

Charles Robertson had four children: George Robertson (born 1900), Dorohea Robertson (born 1904), Ole Robertson (born 1905) and Charles Robertson (born 1911).

Charlesbreen, a glacier in Svalbard is named after him.

Ancestors
On his father's side Charles is a descendant of many Scottish clan chiefs, lairds, earls, (and other Scottish nobility) such as Sir John Maclean, 4th Baronet of Duart and Morvern, Colin Cam Mackenzie, 11th Laird of Kintail and William Graham, 3rd Earl of Menteith. James II of Scotland is Charles' 13×-great-grandfather. On his mother's side he is a descendant of Jens Holmboe and a part of the Holmboe family.

References

1875 births
1958 deaths
20th-century Norwegian politicians
Conservative Party (Norway) politicians
Government ministers of Norway
Holmboe family
Ministers of Trade and Shipping of Norway
Norwegian people of Scottish descent
Royal Norwegian Navy personnel of World War II
People from Hammerfest